James Allen Dotzenrod (born December 4, 1946) is an American politician. He is a member of the North Dakota State Senate from the 26th District, serving since 2009. He is a member of the North Dakota Democratic-Nonpartisan League Party. He also served in the Senate from 1978 to 1994.

References

1946 births
21st-century American politicians
Living people
Democratic Party North Dakota state senators
North Dakota State University alumni
People from Breckenridge, Minnesota